Piotr Adam Rzepka (born 13 September 1961) is a Polish football midfielder and later manager. Besides Poland, he played in France.

References

1961 births
Living people
Polish footballers
Association football midfielders
Poland international footballers
Gwardia Koszalin players
Bałtyk Gdynia players
Górnik Zabrze players
SC Bastia players
En Avant Guingamp players
AC Ajaccio players
Arka Gdynia players
Ekstraklasa players
I liga players
Ligue 2 players
Polish expatriate footballers
Expatriate footballers in France
Polish expatriate sportspeople in France
Polish football managers
Odra Opole managers
Górnik Łęczna managers
Arka Gdynia managers
Olimpia Zambrów managers
People from Koszalin